Sigulda Municipality is a municipality in Vidzeme, Latvia. The municipality was formed in 2003 by merging Sigulda town, Sigulda Parish and More Parish. In 2009 it absorbed Allaži parish, too; the administrative centre being Sigulda. The population in 2020 was 17,992.

On 1 July 2021, Sigulda Municipality was enlarged when Krimulda Municipality, Mālpils Municipality and Inčukalns Parish were merged into it.

Twin towns — sister cities

Sigulda is a member of the Douzelage, a town twinning association of towns across the European Union. This active town twinning began in 1991 and there are regular events, such as a produce market from each of the other countries and festivals. As of 2019, its members are:

 Agros, Cyprus
 Altea, Spain
 Asikkala, Finland
 Bad Kötzting, Germany
 Bellagio, Italy
 Bundoran, Ireland
 Chojna, Poland
 Granville, France
 Holstebro, Denmark
 Houffalize, Belgium
 Judenburg, Austria
 Kőszeg, Hungary
 Marsaskala, Malta
 Meerssen, Netherlands
 Niederanven, Luxembourg
 Oxelösund, Sweden
 Preveza, Greece
 Rokiškis, Lithuania
 Rovinj, Croatia
 Sesimbra, Portugal
 Sherborne, England, United Kingdom
 Siret, Romania
 Škofja Loka, Slovenia
 Sušice, Czech Republic
 Tryavna, Bulgaria
 Türi, Estonia
 Zvolen, Slovakia

Other twinnings

 Angus, Scotland
 Birštonas, Lithuania
 Chiatura, Georgia
 Chocz, Poland
 Falköping, Sweden
 Keila, Estonia
 Stuhr, Germany
 Vesthimmerland, Denmark

Images

See also
Administrative divisions of Latvia

References

 
Municipalities of Latvia
Vidzeme